The 1951 Argentine Primera División was the 60th season of top-flight football in Argentina. The season began on April 15 and ended on December 5. Lanús promoted to Primera División as champion of Primera B
 

Banfield and Racing shared the 1st position at the end of the tournament so a playoff match was held to decide a champion. Racing won the series winning their 12th league title (and third consecutive).

On the other hand, Quilmes and Gimnasia y Esgrima (LP) were relegated. Racing won its 12th league title.

League standings

Championship Playoff 
After finishing 1st in the table (with no goal difference considered), both teams, Banfield and Racing had to play a two-legged series to decide a champion.

Match details

Top scorers

References

Argentine Primera División seasons
p
p
Argentine Primera Division
Primera Division